Toby James Lester (born 5 April 1993) is an English cricketer who last played for Lancashire County Cricket Club. Primarily a left-arm fast-medium bowler, he also bats right handed. He made his Twenty20 debut for Lancashire in the 2018 t20 Blast on 6 July 2018. Lester was released by Lancashire at the end of the 2020 season after six years with the club.

References

External links
 

1993 births
Living people
English cricketers
People from Blackpool
Lancashire cricketers
Loughborough MCCU cricketers
Warwickshire cricketers